Qaleh Now (also Romanized as Qal`eh Now; also known as Qal‘eh Now-ye Seyyedhā, Ghilāna, Qal‘eh Now-e Chambarān, Qal‘ehnow-e Seyyedha, and Qīlāneh) is a village in Darbqazi Rural District, in the Central District of Nishapur County, Razavi Khorasan Province, Iran. At the 2006 census, its population was 32, in 8 families.

References 

Populated places in Nishapur County